Nozomu (written: 望) is a masculine Japanese given name. Notable people with the name include:

, Japanese rugby union player
, Japanese footballer
, Japanese film director
, Japanese footballer
, Japanese businessman and inventor
, Japanese businessman
, Japanese voice actor
, Japanese manga artist

Fictional characters
, a character in the tokusatsu series Tensou Sentai Goseiger
, the main character in Sayonara, Zetsubou-Sensei

See also 
Nozomi (given name)

Japanese masculine given names